Jean-Marc Philippon (born 4 November 1966) is a French former professional footballer who played as a defender. In his career, he played for INF Vichy, Limoges, Saint-Dizier, Louhans-Cuiseaux, Stade Briochin, Épinal, and Grenoble.

Post-playing career 
In 1998, Philippon became a youth coach at Lens. He left the club in 2002 to become a youth coach for Toulouse. He coached the club's under-19 side in the 2003–04 season, and the club's reserve team in the 2007–08 season. From 2002 to 2008, Philippon simultaneously worked as the head of Toulouse's youth academy. From 2009 to 2014, he was an assistant manager at Troyes.

References 

1966 births
Living people
Sportspeople from Roanne
Footballers from Auvergne-Rhône-Alpes
French footballers
Association football defenders
INF Vichy players
Limoges FC players
CO Saint-Dizier players
Louhans-Cuiseaux FC players
Stade Briochin players
SAS Épinal players
Grenoble Foot 38 players
French Division 3 (1971–1993) players
Ligue 2 players
Championnat National 2 players
Association football coaches
French football managers

RC Lens non-playing staff
Toulouse FC non-playing staff
ES Troyes AC non-playing staff